Ambrosiella is a genus of ambrosia fungi within the family Ceratocystidaceae. It was circumscribed by mycologists Josef Adolph von Arx and Grégoire L. Hennebert in 1965 with Ambrosiella xylebori as the type species. All Ambrosiella species are obligate symbionts of ambrosia beetles. Several former species were moved to Raffaelea, Hyalorhinocladiella, or Phialophoropsis  and there are nine species recognized . One species, Ambrosiella cleistominuta, has been observed to produce a fertile sexual state with cleistothecious ascomata.

Species
Ambrosiella batrae
Ambrosiella beaveri
Ambrosiella catenulata
Ambrosiella cleistominuta
Ambrosiella grosmanniae
Ambrosiella hartigii
Ambrosiella nakashimae
Ambrosiella roeperi
Ambrosiella xylebori

References

External links 
 
 Ambrosia Fungi - Species Index

Microascales